The following is a List of awards and nominations received by American actor, producer, and singer Bruce Willis.

American Comedy Awards

Awards Circuit Community Awards

Blockbuster Entertainment Awards

Boston Society of Film Critics Awards

CableACE Award

Central Ohio Film Critics Association Awards

Chlotrudis Awards

Critics' Choice Movie Awards

Gold Derby Awards

Golden Globe Awards

Golden Raspberry Awards

Gotham Awards

Independent Spirit Awards

MTV Movie & TV Awards

National Movie Awards

Nickelodeon Kids' Choice Awards

Online Film & Television Association Awards

People's Choice Awards

Phoenix Film Critics Society Awards

Primetime Emmy Awards

Saturn Awards

Southeastern Film Critics Association Awards

St. Louis Film Critics Association Awards

Stinkers Bad Movie Awards

TV Land Awards

References

External links
 

Awards
Willis, Bruce